National symbols of Japan are the symbols that are used in Japan to represent what is unique about the nation, reflecting different aspects of its cultural life and history.

Symbols of Japan

References

External links

 Japan symbols and flag and national anthem